The arrondissement of Les Sables-d'Olonne is an arrondissement of France in the Vendée department in the Pays de la Loire region. It has 71 communes.

Composition

The communes of the arrondissement of Les Sables-d'Olonne, and their INSEE codes, are:

 Les Achards (85152)
 L'Aiguillon-la-Presqu'île (partly)(85001)
 L'Aiguillon-sur-Vie (85002)
 Angles (85004)
 Avrillé (85010)
 Barbâtre (85011)
 La Barre-de-Monts (85012)
 Beaulieu-sous-la-Roche (85016)
 Beauvoir-sur-Mer (85018)
 Le Bernard (85022)
 Bois-de-Céné (85024)
 La Boissière-des-Landes (85026)
 Bouin (85029)
 Brem-sur-Mer (85243)
 Bretignolles-sur-Mer (85035)
 La Chaize-Giraud (85045)
 Challans (85047)
 Le Champ-Saint-Père (85050)
 La Chapelle-Hermier (85054)
 Châteauneuf (85062)
 Coëx (85070)
 Commequiers (85071)
 Curzon (85077)
 L'Épine (85083)
 Le Fenouiller (85088)
 Froidfond (85095)
 La Garnache (85096)
 Le Girouard (85099)
 Givrand (85100)
 Le Givre (85101)
 Grosbreuil (85103)
 La Guérinière (85106)
 L'Île-d'Olonne (85112)
 L'Île-d'Yeu (85113)
 Jard-sur-Mer (85114)
 La Jonchère (85116)
 Landevieille (85120)
 Longeville-sur-Mer (85127)
 Martinet (85138)
 Moutiers-les-Mauxfaits (85156)
 Nieul-le-Dolent (85161)
 Noirmoutier-en-l'Île (85163)
 Notre-Dame-de-Monts (85164)
 Notre-Dame-de-Riez (85189)
 Le Perrier (85172)
 Poiroux (85179)
 Les Sables-d'Olonne (85194)
 Saint-Avaugourd-des-Landes (85200)
 Saint-Benoist-sur-Mer (85201)
 Saint-Christophe-du-Ligneron (85204)
 Saint-Cyr-en-Talmondais (85206)
 Sainte-Flaive-des-Loups (85211)
 Sainte-Foy (85214)
 Saint-Georges-de-Pointindoux (85218)
 Saint-Gervais (85221)
 Saint-Gilles-Croix-de-Vie (85222)
 Saint-Hilaire-de-Riez (85226)
 Saint-Hilaire-la-Forêt (85231)
 Saint-Jean-de-Monts (85234)
 Saint-Julien-des-Landes (85236)
 Saint-Maixent-sur-Vie (85239)
 Saint-Mathurin (85250)
 Saint-Révérend (85268)
 Saint-Urbain (85273)
 Saint-Vincent-sur-Graon (85277)
 Saint-Vincent-sur-Jard (85278)
 Sallertaine (85280)
 Soullans (85284)
 Talmont-Saint-Hilaire (85288)
 La Tranche-sur-Mer (85294)
 Vairé (85298)

History

The arrondissement of Les Sables-d'Olonne was created in 1800. At the January 2017 reorganisation of the arrondissements of Vendée, it lost eight communes to the arrondissement of La Roche-sur-Yon. In January 2019 the commune Landeronde passed from the arrondissement of Les Sables-d'Olonne to the arrondissement of La Roche-sur-Yon.

As a result of the reorganisation of the cantons of France which came into effect in 2015, the borders of the cantons are no longer related to the borders of the arrondissements. The cantons of the arrondissement of Les Sables-d'Olonne were, as of January 2015:

 Beauvoir-sur-Mer
 Challans
 L'Île-d'Yeu
 La Mothe-Achard
 Moutiers-les-Mauxfaits
 Noirmoutier-en-l'Île
 Palluau
 Les Sables-d'Olonne
 Saint-Gilles-Croix-de-Vie
 Saint-Jean-de-Monts
 Talmont-Saint-Hilaire

References

Les Sables-d'Olonne